Catharosoma is a genus of millipedes belonging to the family Paradoxosomatidae.

The species of this genus are found in Southern America.

Species:

Catharosoma bilineatum 
Catharosoma bolivae 
Catharosoma bromelicola 
Catharosoma curitibense 
Catharosoma digitale 
Catharosoma hoffmani 
Catharosoma ibirapuitense 
Catharosoma intermedium 
Catharosoma mahnerti 
Catharosoma mesorphinum 
Catharosoma mesoxanthum 
Catharosoma mixtum 
Catharosoma myrmekurum 
Catharosoma palmatum 
Catharosoma palustre 
Catharosoma paraguayense 
Catharosoma pedritense 
Catharosoma peraccae 
Catharosoma taeniatum

References

Paradoxosomatidae